Biržai Castle is a castle in Biržai, Lithuania. Construction of the earth bastion-type castle started in 1586 by the order of Krzysztof Mikołaj "the Lightning" Radziwiłł. Major castle building works were finished in 1589.

Since the second half of the 17th century, the castle has been the main seat of the Biržai-Dubingiai Radziwiłł family line, which was transferred here from the Dubingiai Castle. Biržai Castle served as a major defensive structure during the wars with Sweden.

The castle was reconstructed from ruins in the 1980s, in the Renaissance-Baroque style. The residential manor of the castle houses a library and a regional history museum "Sėla" (literally Selonia), founded in 1928.

See also
List of castles in Lithuania

References

External links
The Association of Castles and Museums around the Baltic Sea

Houses completed in 1589
Renaissance architecture in Lithuania
Castles in Lithuania
Museums in Panevėžys County
Buildings and structures in Panevėžys County
Tourist attractions in Panevėžys County
Castles of the Grand Duchy of Lithuania
Castles and palaces of the Radziwiłł family
Biržai